Matt Francis (born September 27, 1985) is a Canadian professional ice hockey player who is currently playing with the Nottingham Panthers of the Elite Ice Hockey League.

References

External links

1985 births
Canadian ice hockey forwards
Gwinnett Gladiators players
Ice hockey people from British Columbia
Living people
Nottingham Panthers players
Worcester Sharks players
Canadian expatriate ice hockey players in England